František Ignác Antonín Tůma (2 October 1704, in Kostelec nad Orlicí, Bohemia – 3 February 1774, in Vienna) was a Czech composer of the Baroque era. He lived the greater part of his life in Vienna, first as director of music for Franz Joseph, Count Kinsky, later filling a similar office for the widow of Emperor Charles VI. 

He was an important late-baroque composer, organist, gambist and theorbist.

Life
Tůma received his early musical training from his father, parish organist at Kostelec, and probably studied at the Clementinum, an important Jesuit seminary in Prague. He likely sang as a tenor chorister under B. M. Černohorský (an important composer and organist) at the Minorite Church of St. James the Great, and he is believed to have received musical instruction from him. Tůma then went to Vienna, where he was active as a church musician; according to Marpurg he became a vice-Kapellmeister at Vienna in 1722. Tůma's name first appears in Viennese records in April 1727, when he got married.

In 1731 he became Compositor und Capellen-Meister to Count Franz Ferdinand Kinsky, who was the High Chancellor of Bohemia. Kinsky's patronage made it possible for him to study counterpoint with Johann Fux in Vienna. He participated in the premiere of Fux's opera Constanza e Fortezza along with Georg Benda and Sylvius Leopold Weiss. In 1734, Kinsky recommended Tůma for the post of the Kapellmeister to Prague Cathedral, but his recommendation arrived too late and Tůma may have remained in Kinsky's service until the latter's death in 1741. In that year he was appointed Kapellmeister to the dowager empress, the widow of Emperor Charles VI. On her death in 1750, Tůma received a pension.

For the next 18 years he remained in Vienna and was active as a composer and as a player on the bass viol and the theorbo; he was esteemed by the court and the nobility, and at least one work may have been commissioned from him by the Empress Maria Theresa. After the death of his wife in about 1768, Tůma lived at the Premonstratensian monastery of Geras (Lower Austria), but in his last illness he returned to Vienna and died in the hospital of the Merciful Brethren in the Leopoldstadt.

Style
Tůma's music belongs stylistically to the late Baroque. His sacred works, which were known to Haydn and Mozart, were noted by his contemporaries for their solidity of texture and their sensitive treatment of the text as well as for their chromaticism. His instrumental music includes trio and quartet sonatas, sinfonias and partitas, mostly for strings and continuo; some of them were clearly intended for orchestral use.

Among his sacred works we find some 65 masses, 29 psalms and 5 settings of the Stabat Mater.

Selected works
Stabat Mater (5)
Mass in C
Mass in E-minor (64 masses)
Symphony No. 7 in A
Symphony in B-flat
Litanie Lauretanie (20)
Partita in D minor, for orchestra
Sonata in G, for orchestra
Psalm (29)
Lamentations
Miserere (1)
Magnificat (3)
Te Deum (1)

Selected discography
The Dresden Album. Johannes Pramsohler. Ensemble Diderot. (Audax Records ADX 13701)

References

Further reading
 Theodore M. Klinka: The choral music of Franz Ignaz Tuma. With a practical edition of selected choral works''. Bell & Howell, Ann Arbor, Mich. 1975.

External links
 
 

1704 births
1774 deaths
18th-century classical composers
18th-century male musicians
18th-century Bohemian musicians
Czech Baroque composers
Czech male classical composers
Czech Roman Catholics
Pupils of Johann Joseph Fux
People from Rychnov nad Kněžnou District